Olhão Garden is a park in New Talborj in the city of Agadir, Morocco. It was inaugurated on 2 March 1992 during the celebration of the Throne Day. It is named after Olhão, a coastal city in southern Portugal that is twinned with Agadir.

References

External links
 Museum of memory in Olhão Garden

Gardens in Morocco